Bharat Prasad Sah is a Nepalese politician. He is a member of Provincial Assembly of Madhesh Province from CPN (Maoist Centre). Sah, a resident of Gaushala, Mahottari, was elected via 2017 Nepalese provincial elections from Mahottari 1(B).

Electoral history

2017 Nepalese provincial elections

References

Living people
1972 births
Madhesi people
21st-century Nepalese politicians
Members of the Provincial Assembly of Madhesh Province
Communist Party of Nepal (Maoist Centre) politicians